The union councils of Pakistan, referred to as village councils in villages, are an elected local government body consisting of 21 councillors, and headed by a Nazim which is equivalent to a mayor or chairperson and a Naib Nazib (vice chairperson). As of 2007, there are 5,375 rural union councils across 115 districts. They form the third-tier of local government and fifth tier overall. Its structure and responsibilities differ between provinces and territories.

Administration
Union councils are the primary governmental institution in Pakistan, Union Councils are often known as "Village Councils" in rural areas,the territory represented by a Village Council usually comprises a large village and surrounding areas, often including nearby small villages. The term Union Council may be used for localities that are part of cities. The territory of a Union Council or Village Council is usually part of a Tehsil (county). Less commonly, a Union Council may be part of a City District.

Headed by a Union Nazim, each union council has 13 elected members or councillors. In addition to four male and two female members elected directly, there are two male and two female representatives of the labour, a minority member, a Union Nazim and his deputy known as Union Naib Nazim. Beside elected members, there are several government employees and functionaries in every union council, who report to the Secretary of the Union Council. The latter is a civil servant appointed by the state. The addition of seats for minority members and special interests was implemented in part due to people not wanting to run for election when the Union council system was first implemented. 

Union Councils perform numerous functions including levying taxes, building infrastructure, and acting as an alternative dispute resolution system.

References

Local government in Pakistan